The Bahrain national handball team is the national handball team of Bahrain and is controlled by the Bahrain Handball Federation. In May  of 2021 Aron Kristjánsson returned to his position as head coach, taking over from Halldór Jóhann Sigfússon, who took over in 2020. 

In January of 2022 Bahrain made it to the final of the 2022 Asian Men's Handball Championship, getting to the final for the fifth time in seven tournaments. They would go on to face Qatar in the final.

Results

Olympic Games

World Championship

Asian Championship

Current squad
Squad for the 2023 World Men's Handball Championship.

Head coach: Aron Kristjánsson

References

External links
IHF profile

Men's national handball teams
Bahrain